"Haastaja" is a song by Finnish pop singer Jontte Valosaari. Released as the second single from Valosaari's debut album of the same name, the song peaked at number 18 on the Finnish Download Chart.

Chart performance

References

External links
 
 Lyrics of this song - Haastaja

2013 singles
Jontte Valosaari songs
2013 songs
EMI Records singles